Pablo Elorza (born June 10, 1982 in Villa María, Córdoba, Argentina) is a bass player, composer, arranger, author, producer and educator.

Biography

In 1998, influenced by his brother, began studying the bass guitar and popular music in EMPO. (School of Popular Music).

In 2000, and based in the city of Córdoba, extended for three years at the School of Music "La Colmena" and participates in seminars, clinics and private studies with teachers of music from the likes of Alejandro Herrera, Javier Malosetti, Dave Weckl, Guillermo Vadala, Chango Spasiuk, Lee Konitz, Ernesto Jodos, Nick Schneider, Steve Zenz, Fred Sturm, among others.

In 2003, begins with self-development and research on electric bass, resulting thus in a new teaching method "The Litlle String" published in the U.S. in 2007.

In 2004, he began his work as a session recording player for various artists of diverse genres such as rock, pop, folk, funk, jazz, Latin, kids music, fusion, folk song, soul, among others.

In 2007, he released his first solo album of contemporary jazz "The Other", which receives Docta award 2007 for Best Jazz "Solo Composition".

In 2008, and based in Buenos Aires, he wrote his first work of symphonic character "of Buenos Aires Astor" in tribute to Astor Piazzolla and has since made arrangements, orchestrations and written music for various formations and styles including String Quartet, musical comedy, jazz big band, jazz combo, concert band, trios, among others. His concert band arrangement of "Adios Nonino" by the Argentine bandoneon player Astor Piazzolla and his classical studies for Bass "5 Etudes for Electric Bass" also were published in the United States.

In 2010, released his second solo album Jazz "EPTrío - Vol1" searching for a new role for the electric bass. Using audio effects he created a sound similar to a wind instrument played in the context of traditional jazz trio accompanied by upright bass and drums.

In 2011, two of his compositions become part of the project Real Book Argentina, a collection of popular music written by Argentine authors of all generations.

In 2012, he recorded his third album "Japanese Garden" with a big band he called "Pablo Elorza Orchestra". This lineup was created in late 2011 bringing together a large group of Argentine jazz artists. The compositions of the album, all originals, can be framed within the genre fusion or world music with rhythmic elements from all over the world and the improvisational flavor of jazz.

In September of the same year he made the educational video "Deep Into Electric Bass Classics" analyzing Havona, the mythical theme by bassist Jaco Pastorius. Bassist and educator Jon Liebman chose it as "video of the week" in his famous digital community "For Bass Players Only".

Discography

Solo:

Composer / Arranger / Sessionist:

External links
 http://monitorinterior.blogspot.com/2011/04/pablo-elorza-en-el-estudio-de-monitor.html
 https://web.archive.org/web/20120819131108/http://www.doctajazz.com.ar/blog/pablo-elorza-bajista-y-compositor/
 https://web.archive.org/web/20120816202334/http://anteriores.eldiariocba.com.ar/~diariweb/anteriores/2007/Setiembre/04%20de%20setiembre%20de%202007/cultura/cultura.htm
 http://caminandoproducciones.blogspot.com/2007/07/el-otro-primer-disco-pablo-elorza-trio.html
 https://archive.today/20121230201112/http://www.eldiariocba.com.ar/noticias/nota.asp?nid=33710
 http://www.pabloelorza.com

References

1982 births
Argentine bass guitarists
Argentine composers
Argentine educators
Argentine male writers
Living people
21st-century bass guitarists